Andrej Martin was the defending champion but chose not to defend his title.

Marcelo Arévalo won the title after defeating Roberto Cid Subervi 6–3, 6–7(3–7), 6–4 in the final.

Seeds

Draw

Finals

Top half

Bottom half

References
Main Draw
Qualifying Draw

San Luis Open Challenger Tour - Singles
2018 Singles